Aq Bolaq-e Mohammad Hoseyn Khan (also Romanized as Āq Bolāq-e Moḩammad Ḩoseyn Khān; also known as Āqbolāgh, Āq Bolāgh, Āq Bolāgh-e Moḩammad Ḩoseyn Khān, and Āq Bulāq) is a village in Malmir Rural District, Sarband District, Shazand County, Markazi Province, Iran. At the 2006 census, its population was 181, in 50 families.

References 

Populated places in Shazand County